Yevhen Oleksandrovych Bokhashvili (born 5 January 1993) is a Ukrainian professional footballer who plays as a forward for Indonesian club PSS Sleman.

Career
He is product of Dnipro sportive school.
He went to play for half-year on loan for the Ukrainian Premier League's club Karpaty Lviv in June 2013.

PSS Sleman
On 28 February 2019, Bokhashvili moved to Indonesia and joined Liga 1 side PSS Sleman on free transfer. Bokhashvili made his PSS Sleman debut in a pre-season friendly against Badak Lampung on 27 April. and his league debut on 15 may, he made his debut by starting in a 3–1 win against Arema, and in the second half, he finally scored his first goal for PSS, with a curling shot in the 57th minute.

On 17 February 2021, Bokhashvili moved to Malaysia for joined Malaysia Super League club and officially no longer joins as a PSS player. Previously, he had sent a letter of resignation to the club's management and at the same time explained the reasons for leaving PSS. He contributed with 17 goals in 36 appearances during two season with PSS Sleman.

Sri Pahang
On 17 February 2021, Bokhashvili moved to Malaysia and joined Malaysia Super League side Sri Pahang on free transfer. and he made his league debut for Sri Pahang on 6 March in a lost 3–1 against Selangor. On 16 March, Bokhashvili scored his first goal for Sri Pahang in a 2–1 victory over Sabah at the Darul Makmur Stadium.

Persipura Jayapura
In 2021, Bokhashvili signed for Persipura Jayapura to play in 2021 Liga 1. On 28 August, Bokhashvili made his league debut by starting in a 1–2 lost at Persita Tangerang.

On 11 January 2022, Bokhashvili scored his first goal for Persipura in a 2–1 victory over Persija Jakarta at the Kapten I Wayan Dipta Stadium. On 6 February, he scored a brace for the club in a 2–0 away win against Persebaya Surabaya. On 5 March, Bokhashvili scored from a penalty kick, opening the scoring in a 1–1 draw over Persikabo 1973. He contributed with 8 goals in 26 league appearances during with Persipura Jayapura.

Nam Dinh
In July 2022, Bokhashvili signed for Nam Dinh to play in 2022 V.League 1. On 29 July 2022, Bokhashvili made his club debut in a 1–0 lose against SHB Da Nang.

ASC Oțelul Galați
In September 2022, Bokhashvili decided to Europe and signed a contract with Romanian Liga II club ASC Oțelul Galați. Bokhashvili made his club debut on 3 September in a 1–0 win against SSU Politehnica Timișoara, he coming on as a substitutes for George Cârjan before match ended. Bokhashvili made just 10 league appearances with just one assist. In the Cupa României, Bokhashvili played five times, 4 times as a starter and 1 came out as a substitute. He made 2 goals and 1 assist.

Return to PSS Sleman
On 10 January 2023, Bokhashvili decided to Asia sign a contract with his former club since 2019, PSS Sleman. He made his club debut on 21 January, coming on as a starter, also scored his first goal in 34th minute in a 2–0 win against RANS Nusantara. He scored the winning goal in a 2–0 over Arema on 26 January and scored a brace for the club in a 1–2 away win over PS Barito Putera five days later. On 13 February, Bokhashvili scored in a 4–2 lose against Persebaya Surabaya at Gelora Joko Samudro Stadium.

Honours

Club
FC Torpedo Kutaisi
 Georgian Super Cup: 2018

References

External links 
 
 

1993 births
Living people
Footballers from Dnipro
Ukrainian footballers
Ukrainian people of Georgian descent
Association football forwards
Ukraine youth international footballers
Ukraine under-21 international footballers
Ukrainian Premier League players
Erovnuli Liga players
Belarusian Premier League players
Liga 1 (Indonesia) players
Malaysia Super League players
V.League 1 players
Liga II players
FC Dnipro players
FC Kryvbas Kryvyi Rih players
FC Karpaty Lviv players
FC Volyn Lutsk players
FC Naftovyk-Ukrnafta Okhtyrka players
FC Rukh Lviv players
FC Torpedo Kutaisi players
FC Minsk players
PSS Sleman players
Sri Pahang FC players
Persipura Jayapura players
Nam Định F.C. players
ASC Oțelul Galați players
Ukrainian expatriate footballers
Expatriate footballers in Georgia (country)
Expatriate footballers in Belarus
Expatriate footballers in Indonesia
Expatriate footballers in Malaysia
Expatriate footballers in Vietnam
Expatriate footballers in Romania
Ukrainian expatriate sportspeople in Georgia (country)
Ukrainian expatriate sportspeople in Belarus
Ukrainian expatriate sportspeople in Indonesia
Ukrainian expatriate sportspeople in Malaysia
Ukrainian expatriate sportspeople in Vietnam
Ukrainian expatriate sportspeople in Romania